Tukang Bubur Naik Haji the Series (A Porridge-Seller Performs the Hajj the Series) is an Indonesian primetime soap opera that aired on RCTI everyday from 2012 to 2017. The series is produced by SinemArt and based on earlier television film of the same name. The series features a large ensemble cast whose characters lives in a fictional neighborhood, Kampung Dukuh, but mainly revolves around the titular porridge-seller, Bang Sulam (Mat Solar) who lives with his wife, Rodhiyah (Uci Bing Slamet), and Emak Haji (Nani Wijaya). Solar left the show in 2013 due to health reasons. His character is said to have left to finally achieve his dream of performing the Hajj; his character is later killed in the 1.001th episode while living in Mecca.

In 2017, the series abruptly ended due to SinemArt's deal to move its programs to SCTV. However, the remaining cast members begin to star on a new soap opera with a similar theme titled "Orang Orang Kampung Dukuh", but with new characters and storylines; however it was soon cancelled.

Plot 
Bang Sulam, the titular porridge-seller, makes a living selling chicken congee. He lives with his wife, Rodhiyah, and Emak Haji. Along the way, he earns enough money to perform the Hajj. Unfortunately, he is unable to do so, and dies in the 1,001th episode.

Meanwhile, Sulam's neighbours, Muhidin and Maemunah, hold an inveterate grudge against him.

Cast 
Mat Solar as Haji Sulam 
Uci Bing Slamet as Hajjah Rodhiyah
Nani Widjaja as Emak Haji 
Citra Kirana as Rumana
Andi Arsyil as Robby Zidni
Aditya Herpavi as Rahmadi
Alice Norin as Rere 
El Manik as Ustadz Zakaria
Latief Sitepu as Haji Muhidin
Shinta Muin as Hajjah Maemunah
Dorman Borisman as Haji Rasyidi
Anwar Fuady as Pak Debong
Ben Kasyafani as Fauzi/Oji
Annisa Trihapsari as Hajjah Rumi
Nova Soraya as Romlah
Cholidi Asadil Alam as Ustadz Ghofar
Salim Bungsu as Mang Odjo 
Derry Sudarisman as Machmud 
Abdel Achrian as Ncing Nelan 
Rico Tampatty as Pak Nur
Cut Keke as Bu Retno
Mega Aulia as Atika
Ujang Ronda as Sobari
Edy Oglek as Kardun
Lulu Zakaria as Hajjah Rasuna
Fera Feriska as Pipit Laksmita
Hamka Siregar as Tulang Togu
Tyas Wahono as Ustadz Sulthony
Cut Syifa as Maysaroh
Dewi Alam Purnama as Soimah 
Johan Jehan as Ngadimin
Ricky Malau as Ali Subadar/Badar
Nena Rosier as Bu Betari
Intan Pramita Dewi as Laila 
Pamela Chelsea Taroreh as Rachel 
Zahwa Aqilah as Khofifah
Adam Rama as Hisyam
Dina Lorenza as Riyamah
Marini Zumarnis as Umi Maryam
Connie Sutedja as Nyai Hajjah Iroh  
Adipura Prabahaswara as Hari Sukardi
Ravi Romario as Joni
Juan Christian as Farid
Wingky Harun as Aki Daud
Etty Sumiati as Nini Leha 
Binyo Sungkar as Tarmidzi
Dedi Maulana as Malih
Lucky Perdana as Zaki
Al Fathir Muchtar as Fahmi
Najwa Shakira as Anggi 
Mohammad Noor Ali as Bayu  
Willa Julaiha as Ncum 
Sisy Syahwardi as Neneng Markoneng 
Sisca Liana as Ety Suketi 
Amelia Ekawati as Ulah
Rizky Amelia as Tutik
Gilang Rino as Kirno
Ucha Limau as Rojik
Tengku Firmansyah as Anshori
Cindy Fatika Sari as Lutfia
Hanggini Purinda Retto as Hartati 
Dwi Ayu Kurnia as Yu Jum 
Haydar Ali Assegaf as Elang Supandi
Mila Rahmawati as Iren
Anissa Aziza as Nurhasanah 
Nabilah Zahra as Azizah
Meidiana Hutomo as Hajjah Aisyah 
Asri Welas as Epih
Lenny Charlotte as Umi Enok
Fira Salsabila as Zuraida/Ida
Lian Firman as Rahman
Yono Daryono as Man Damin
Dafi Thoriq as Shidiq
Afrizal Anoda as Sutan Taslim
Mutiara Sani as Namboru Rosidah
Devi Permatasari as Dewi
Rionaldo Stockhorst as Rio
Claudia Andhara as Rindang
Sigit Antonio as Pak Susilo
Rio Reifan as Restu
Tetty Liz Indriati as Herawati
Bella Kuku Tanesia as Cindy 
Marsell Juno as Duryat 
Syamsul Gondo as Toha 
Romi Pratama Putra as Iping/Ipin 
Monica Amanta as Suti 
Muhammad Rafiq Habibi as Habibie 
Safinah Kamaniya as Rania Umairah Zidny
M.Syafi as Rawun
Lilis Ireng as Mbak Pur
Panji Wardana as Romy
Ichal Muhammad as Bima
Zulfikar Nasution as Farid
Celine Evangelista as Cathy
Ashraf Sinclair as Rayhan
Erica Putri as Salma
Torro Margens as Drs. Suroso Kimpling
Qhelya Zavyera Valendro as Jessy
Irwan Chandra as Wan-wan
Ayu Andriana as Leny	
Salman Alfarizi as Ko Acong	
Nadya Almira as Laksmi
Ine Dewi as Dona
Gema Vyandra as Amin
Riza Syah as Sandy
Ilham Nurkarim as Adam
Ana Pinem as Tiya 
Rahmi Nurullina as Nafisah
Ali Syakieb as Bayu
Tika Putri as Mutiara
Iqbal Pakula as Iwan
Nabila Zavira as Aura
Tora Sudiro as Maul
Mieke Amalia as Imas

Special appearances
 Kristen Bauer (Deputy Ambassador of the United States)
 Ustadz Yusuf Mansur
 Johannes Wahyudi (Rudi, the bank manager)
 Richard J. Oentaryo (Dedi, Rudi's father)
 Tri Noviardi Thamrin (Bank robber)
 Richard Aditya Nugraha (Bank robber's accomplice)
 Johannes Charles (Bank teller who got murdered by the bank robbers)

Ranking 
Tukang Bubur Naik Haji the Series is a soap opera that is ranked fourth after Cinta Fitri, Putri yang Ditukar, and Islam KTP.

Comparison

External links 
 Sinopsis Tukang Bubur Naik Haji The Series

Indonesian television soap operas
2012 Indonesian television series debuts